is a former Japanese football player.

Playing career
Kojima was born in Shiga Prefecture on August 4, 1973. After he dropped out from Kindai University, he joined the J1 League club, Kashiwa Reysol, in June 1995. In 1999, he moved to Vissel Kobe. He played 12 matches in 2 seasons and he retired at the end of the 2000 season.

Club statistics

References

External links

1973 births
Living people
Kindai University alumni
Association football people from Shiga Prefecture
Japanese footballers
J1 League players
Kashiwa Reysol players
Vissel Kobe players
Association football defenders